Satsimranjit Dhindsa (born 5 February 1991) is a Canadian cricketer. He made his List A cricket debut in the 2015 ICC World Cricket League Division Two tournament for Canada against the Netherlands on 17 January 2015.

In January 2018, he was named in Canada's squad for the 2018 ICC World Cricket League Division Two tournament.

On 3 June 2018, he was selected to play for the Edmonton Royals in the players' draft for the inaugural edition of the Global T20 Canada tournament. In June 2019, he was selected to play for the Edmonton Royals franchise team in the 2019 Global T20 Canada tournament.

References

External links
 

1991 births
Living people
Canadian cricketers
Indian emigrants to Canada